Beate Reinstadler (born 20 May 1967) is a former professional Austrian tennis player.

Career
Reinstadler played on the WTA Tour between 1986 and 1997. During that time she won two ITF titles, one in Ashkelon and one in Flensburg. Despite no standout performance in Grand Slam events, Reinstadler did reach the third round at the Australian Open in 1994 and at the French Open in 1995.

Reinstadler reached a career-high singles ranking of No. 60 on 20 June 1994. Her highest doubles ranking was No. 147, achieved on 6 February 1995. During her career she defeated many top ten players, including No. 3 Helena Sukova and No. 7 Lisa Raymond at Stratton Mountain in 1993.

Reinstadler played for Austria in the Fed Cup on four occasions. She won one match and lost the other three. She retired from professional tennis in 1997.

ITF finals

Singles: 4 (2 titles, 2 runner-ups)

References

External links
 
 

1967 births
Living people
Sportspeople from Stuttgart
Austrian female tennis players